The Physical Tour (also known as the Physical Tour of North America and North American Tour '82) was the fifth concert tour by Australian recording artist Olivia Newton-John, in support of her 12th studio album, Physical (1981). The tour primarily visited North America the second largest by Newton-John, visiting arenas and stadiums.

The show had advanced technical aspects at the time, and was divided into four segments, determined by Newton-John costume changes and a video interlude. The tour was a commercial success and received generally positive reviews, regarded as one of the most popular and most remembered shows by the singer. Footage from the tour has been broadcast on a number of channels across the world. Olivia in Concert, a concert home video of Newton-John's performance in Ogden, Utah, was released in 1983.

Background and development
Billboard announced in July 1982 that Newton-John would embark upon a 50-date North American tour from early August, her first in four years, with a TV concert special, also was confirmed. Newton-John stated that this would be her last tour to concentrate on her film career. However, after the failure of the film Two of a Kind (1983), which she starred again with John Travolta, her film career went on hiatus, and she would return to touring 16 years after this tour.

The first attempts for the setlist included the songs "Come on Over", "Don't Stop Believin'", "Pony Ride" and the music video for "Stranger's Touch" (from Olivia Physical) as a video interlude. The jazz musician Tom Scott was the tour musical director and also played saxophone in the band. He also served as the opening act, performing songs from his album Desire (1982). Olivia's personal friend, Karen Carpenter, attended various tour shows, and considered the possibility of drumming during a few concerts, but dropped because of her deteriorating health. John Travolta also attended a show, and joined the stage with Newton-John.

The stage was created by Kenny Ortega, who also choreographed Newton-John music videos for "Physical" and "The Rumour". The technical features used in concert includes a glittery substance falling during "Silvery Rain", and three videos: an introduction montage about Olivia's career, the music video for "The Promise (The Dolphin Song)" as a video interlude, and screened credits for the band and crew members at the concert ending. Newton-John also jumped rope through "Physical". During a 1983 article for People, Newton-John declared she didn't like to tour in 1982: "Every night was like déja vu. You say to yourself, 'Haven't I just done this?'"

Legacy
Robert Hilburn from Los Angeles Times compared Debbie Gibson performance on her Out of the Blue Tour with Newton-John's Physical Tour, commenting that "recalled the most triumphant moments of Olivia Newton-John's 1982 'Physical' tour" and "as the evening progressed, it became clear that Newton-John (who exhibited a similar aerobic energy, sparkling smile and even blonde bangs) was a closer parallel". British duo Goldfrapp performed a cover of "Physical" on their 2001 concert tour. Alison Goldfrapp herself said later that Newton-John is one of the duo inspirations.

Critical response
Jon Pareles from The New York Times commented that "purists may be offended – particularly in country music, where she dallied awhile – but pop singers like Miss Newton-John make new styles safe for mass audiences just as they're on the way out. [...] Miss Newton-John has a nearly colorless voice, distinguished mainly by the break between a perky chest register and a fragile head voice. Yet it is also extremely adaptable; onstage, she summoned country's quavers, disco's melismas, pop's directness and hard rock's percussive staccato. She sounds delicate on her records, but she sang a 90-minute set with no obvious strain."

Paul Grein from Billboard wrote: "Newton-John first local apparition in five years – since her co-starring role in Grease revived and redirected her career – was a total triumph, eliciting the boisterous fan response normally seen only at rock shows. [...] Newton-John also sings with greater strengths and conviction, even on the older ballads. Her emphatic vocals gave an extra emotional dimension to the rueful 'Sam' and the plaintive 'Please Mr. Please'."

Commercial reception
The tour performed in 40 cities throughout North America, with a total of 562,428 tickets sold. The Exhibition Stadium show in Toronto, Ontario, Canada, had all of the 24,789 tickets sold. Based on 13 shows, Billboard Boxscore reported a gross of  $$2,074,051 and a total boxscore of $8,443,043. Items related to the tour that were sold include clothings, buttons and the tourbook.

Broadcast and recordings

The tour video recording was filmed in Ogden, Utah, on 12–13 October 1982. An interesting fact is that "Physical" has caused controversy in Utah after two radio stations banned the song because "lyrics are more suggestive than most songs". The video was premiered on HBO on 23 January 1983, as Olivia: Live in Concert TV special. It was later released on VHS, CED and laserdisc by MCA Home Video as Olivia in Concert, becoming a critical and commercial success.

The video release peaked at #15 on Billboard Top Videodisks and was certified gold by the Recording Industry Association of America for shipment of 50,000 units in the United States. The video also gave for Newton-John nominations for a Grammy Award for Best Long Form Music Video and a CableACE Award for Actress in a Variety Program. People wrote: "Mini-clad and punk-coiffed, Livvy rocks her way through a concert taped at Weber State College in Utah. "Xanadu" and "Heart Attack" are fetching, but "Physical" is the aerobic showstopper".

Opening act
Tom Scott

Setlist
"Video Sequence" 
Act 1
"Deeper Than the Night"
"Have You Never Been Mellow"
"Let Me Be There" / "If Not for You" / "Please Mr. Please" / "If You Love Me (Let Me Know)"
"Jolene"
"Sam"
"Video Sequence"
Act 2
"Xanadu"
"Magic"
"Suddenly" (performed with Dennis Tufano)
"A Little More Love"
"Video Sequence" 
Act 3
"Silvery Rain"
"Falling"
"Heart Attack"
"Make a Move on Me"
"Hopelessly Devoted to You"
"You're the One That I Want" (performed with Tufano)
Encore
"Physical"
"I Honestly Love You"

Known tour dates

Box office score data

Personnel

Olivia Newton-John – vocals
Tom Scott – saxophone/musical director
Carlos Vega – drums
Buzz Feiten – guitars
Michael Landau – guitars
Robert 'Pops' Popwell – bass guitar

Kevin Bassinson – keyboards
David Iwataki – keyboards
Judi Brown – backing vocals
Dennis Tufano – backing vocals
Stephanie Spruill – backing vocals
Roger Davies – personal management, for Regency Artists, Ltd.

Source:

External links
  Olivia Newton-John's official website

References

1982 concert tours
Olivia Newton-John concert tours